Sisurcana ruficilia is a species of moth of the family Tortricidae. It is found in Tungurahua Province, Ecuador.

The wingspan is about 30.5 mm. The ground colour of the forewings is yellowish brown to the middle, brownish densely strigulated (finely streaked) grey postmedially (with two reddish rust marks postbasally) and dark brown in the distal third. The markings are dark brown in the basal half, partially edged whitish. The hindwings are cream, with a slight brown admixture, brownish on the periphery.

Etymology
The species name refers to presence of a postbasal mark on the forewing and is derived from Latin  rufus (meaning rust) and Greek graptos (meaning marked).

References

Moths described in 2009
Sisurcana
Moths of South America
Taxa named by Józef Razowski